Orality is thought and verbal expression in societies where the technologies of literacy (especially writing and print) are unfamiliar to most of the population. The study of orality is closely allied to the study of oral tradition.

The term "orality" has been used in a variety of ways, often to describe, in a generalised fashion, the structures of consciousness found in cultures that do not employ, or employ minimally, the technologies of writing.

Walter J. Ong's work was foundational for the study of orality, and exemplifies the fact that despite the striking success and subsequent power of written language, the vast majority of languages are never written, and  the basic orality of language is permanent.

In his later publications Ong distinguishes between two forms of orality: 'primary orality' and 'secondary orality'. Primary orality refers to thought and expression un-touched by the culture of writing of print; secondary orality is explained by Ong as oral culture defined (implicitly influenced) by the written and printed word, and includes oral culture made possible by technology such as a newscaster reading a news report on television.

In addition, 'residual orality' is also defined – it is the remnants, legacy, or influence of a predominately oral culture carried over into the written realm – an example might include the use of dialogue as a philosophical or didactic tool in written literature, such as used by the Greek thinker Plato.

Origins of philosophy and definition

Impact of literacy on culture
Before writing became a way for many cultures, we had orality. Unfortunately much of the retained orality has been lost or drastically changed. Those that were able to be preserved gives us insight to past cultures and just how much we have evolved since then. In Orality and Literacy (2nd ed. ), Ong sums up his own work over the previous three decades as well as the work of numerous other scholars. With regard to oral tradition and primary orality he draws on pioneering work by Milman Parry, Albert B. Lord, and Eric A. Havelock. Marshall McLuhan was among the first to fully appreciate the significance of the Ong's earlier work about print culture and the written and printed word as a technology.  In his work, The Gutenberg Galaxy , McLuhan quotes and discusses works by Ong in the 1950s regarding print culture. Orality gave us the stepping stones that allowed us to get where we are today, it was a necessity for the growth of civilization. But using his own examples to amplify Ong's thought, McLuhan shows how each stage in the development of this technology throughout the history of communication – from the invention of speech (primary orality), to pictograms,  to the phonetic alphabet, to typography, to the electronic communications of today – restructures human consciousness, profoundly changing not only the frontiers of human possibility, but even the frontiers it is possible for humans to imagine.

Primary orality
'Primary orality' refers to thought and its verbal expression within cultures "totally untouched by any knowledge of writing or print."

All sound is inherently powerful. If a hunter kills a lion he can see it, touch it, feel it and smell it. But if he hears a lion he must act, fast, because the sound of the lion signals its presence and its power. Speech is a form of sound that shares this common power. Like other sounds, it comes from within a living organism. A text can be ignored; it is just writing on paper. But to ignore speech can be unwise; our basic instincts compel us to pay attention.

Writing is powerful in a different way: it permits people to generate ideas, store them, and retrieve them as needed across time in a highly efficient and accurate way. The absence of this technology in oral societies limits the development of complex ideas and the institutions that depend on them. Instead, sustained thought in oral settings depends on interpersonal communication, and storing complex ideas over a long period of time requires packaging them in highly memorable ways, generally by using mnemonic tools.

In his studies of the Homeric Question, Milman Parry was able to show that the poetic metre found in the Iliad and the Odyssey had been 'packaged' by oral Greek society to meet its information management needs. These insights first opened the door to a wider appreciation of the sophistication of oral traditions, and their various methods of managing information. Later, ancient and medieval mnemonic tools were extensively documented by Frances Yates in her book The Art of Memory.

Residual orality

‘Residual orality’ refers to thought and its verbal expression in cultures that have been exposed to writing and print, but have not fully ‘interiorized’ (in McLuhan's term) the use of these technologies in their daily lives.  As a culture interiorizes the technologies of literacy, the ‘oral residue’ diminishes.

But the availability of a technology of literacy to a society is not enough to ensure its widespread diffusion and use.  For example, Eric Havelock observed in A Preface to Plato that after the ancient Greeks invented writing they adopted a scribal culture that lasted for generations.  Few people, other than the scribes, considered it necessary to learn to read or write.  In other societies, such as ancient Egypt or medieval Europe, literacy has been a domain confined to political and religious elites.

Many cultures have experienced an equilibrium state in which writing and mass illiteracy have co-existed for hundreds or even thousands of years.

Oral residue rarely disappears quickly and never vanishes completely.  Speech is inherently an oral event, based on human relationships, unlike texts.  Oral societies can mount strong resistance to literate technologies, as vividly shown in the arguments of Socrates against writing in Plato's Phaedrus.  Writing, Socrates argues, is inhuman.  It attempts to turn living thoughts dwelling in the human mind into mere objects in the physical world.  By causing people to rely on what is written rather than what they are able to think, it weakens the powers of the mind and of memory.  True knowledge can only emerge from a relationship between active human minds.  And unlike a person, a text can't respond to a question; it will just keep saying the same thing over and over again, no matter how often it is refuted.

The Canadian communications scholar, Harold Innis argued that a balance between the spoken word and writing contributed to the cultural and intellectual vitality of ancient Greece in Plato's time. Plato conveyed his ideas by writing down the conversations of Socrates thus "preserving the power of the spoken word on the written page." Aristotle, Innis wrote, regarded Plato's style as "halfway between poetry and prose." Plato was able to arrive at new philosophical positions "through the use of dialogues, allegories and illustrations."

Furthermore, as McLuhan emphasizes, modernization attenuates some oral capabilities.  For example, in medieval Europe silent reading was largely unknown.  This tilted the readers' attention towards the poetic and other auditory aspects of the text.  Educated modern adults may also occasionally long for something like "the capacious medieval memory, which, untrammeled by the associations of print, could learn a strange language with ease and by the methods of a child, and could retain in memory and reproduce lengthy epic and elaborate lyric poems."
McLuhan and Ong also document the apparent re-emergence, in the electronic age, of a kind of 'secondary orality' that displaces written words with audio/visual technologies like radio, telephones, and television.  Unlike primary oral modes of communication, these technologies depend on print for their existence.  Mass Internet collaborations, such as Wikipedia, rely primarily on writing, but re-introduce relationships and responsiveness into the text.

Importance of the concept

It has been a habit of literate cultures to view oral cultures simply in terms of their lack of the technologies of writing. This habit, argues Ong, is dangerously misled. Oral cultures are living cultures in their own right. A 1971 study found that of 3,000 extant languages, only 78 had a written literature. While literacy extends human possibilities in both thought and action, all literate technologies ultimately depend on the ability of humans to learn oral languages and then translate sound into symbolic imagery.

Understanding between nations may depend to some degree on understanding oral culture. Ong argues that "many of the contrasts often made between 'western' and other views seem reducible to contrasts between deeply interiorized literacy and more or less residually oral states of consciousness."

Theory of the characteristics of oral culture
Drawing on hundreds of studies from anthropology, linguistics and the study of oral tradition, Ong summarizes ten key aspects of the 'psychodynamics of orality'. While these are subject to continuing debate, his list remains an important milestone. Ong draws his examples from both primary oral societies, and societies with a very high 'oral residue'.

Formulaic styling
To retain complex ideas requires that they be packaged memorably for easy recall.

{|style="border:1px; border: thin solid white; background-color:#f6f6FF; margin:20px;" cellpadding="10"
|-
| To solve effectively the problem of retaining and retrieving carefully articulated thought, you have to do your thinking in mnemonic patterns, shaped for ready oral recurrence. Your thoughts must come into being in heavily rhythmic, balanced patterns, in repetitions or antithesis, in alliterations or assonances, in epithetic and other formulary expressions... Serious thought is intertwined with memory systems.
|}

Anthropologist Marcel Jousse identifies a close linkage between rhythm and breathing patterns, gestures and the bilateral symmetry of the human body in several ancient verse traditions. This synergy between the body and the construction of oral thought further fuels memory.

Additive rather than subordinative
Oral cultures avoid complex 'subordinative' clauses. Ong cites an example from the Douay-Rheims version of Genesis (1609–10), noting that this basic additive pattern (in italics) has been identified in many oral contexts around the world:

{|style="border:1px; border: thin solid white; background-color:#f6f6FF; margin:20px;" cellpadding="10"
|-
| In the beginning God created heaven and earth. And the earth was void and empty, and darkness was on the face of the deep; and the spirit of God moved over the waters. And God said ...
|}

Demonstrating how oral modes of communication tend to evolve into literate ones, Ong additionally cites the New American Bible (1970), which offers a translation that is grammatically far more complex:

{|style="border:1px; border: thin solid white; background-color:#f6f6FF; margin:20px;" cellpadding="10"
|-
| In the beginning, when God created the heavens and the earth, the earth was a formless wasteland, and darkness covered the abyss, while a mighty wind swept over the waters. Then God said ...
|}

Aggregative rather than analytic
Oral expression brings words together in pithy phrases that are the product of generations of evolution: the 'sturdy oak tree', the 'beautiful princess' or 'clever Odysseus'. This does not apply specifically to poetry or song; rather the words are brought together out of habit during general communication. 'Analyzing' or breaking apart such expressions is risky: they represent the work of generations and "there is nowhere outside the mind to store them."

Ong cites an American example, noting that in some parts of the United States with heavy oral residue, until the early twentieth-century it was still considered normal or even obligatory to use the adjective ‘glorious’ when referring to the 'Fourth of July'.

Redundant or 'copious'
Speech that repeats earlier thoughts or thought-pictures, or shines a different light on them somehow, helps to keep both the speaker and the listener focused on the topic, and makes it easier for all to recall the key points later. "Oral cultures encourage fluency, fulsomeness, volubility. Rhetoricians were to call this copia"

Conservative or traditionalist
Because oral societies have no effective access to writing and print technologies, they must invest considerable energy in basic information management. Storage of information, being primarily dependent on individual or collective recall, must be handled with particular thrift. It is possible to approximately measure oral residue "from the amount of memorization the culture's educational procedures require."

This creates incentives to avoid exploring new ideas and particularly to avoid the burden of having to store them. It does not prevent oral societies from demonstrating dynamism and change, but there is a premium on ensuring that changes cleave to traditional formulas, and "are presented as fitting the traditions of the ancestors."

Close to the human lifeworld
Oral cultures take a practical approach to information storage. To qualify for storage, information must usually concern matters of immediate practical concern or familiarity to most members of the society.

Long after the invention of writing, and often long after the invention of print, basic information on how to perform a society's most important trades was left unwritten, passed from one generation to the next as it always had been: through apprenticeship, observation and practice.

By contrast, only literary cultures have launched phenomenological analyses, abstract classifications, ordered lists and tables, etc. Nothing analogous exists in oral societies.

Agonistically toned

'Agonistic' means 'combative', but Ong actually advances a deeper thesis with this point. Writing and to an even greater extent print, he argues, disengage humans from direct, interpersonal struggle.

Products of "the highly polarized, agonistic, oral world of good and evil, virtue and vice, villains and heroes," the great works of oral literature from Homer to Beowulf, from the Mwindo epic to the Old Testament, are extremely violent by modern standards. They are also punctuated by frequent and intense intellectual combat and tongue-lashings on the one hand, and effusive praise (perhaps reaching its height among African praise singers) on the other.

Empathetic and participatory
In an oral culture the most reliable and trusted technique for learning is to share a "close, empathetic, communal association" with others who know.

Ong cites a study of community decision-making from 12th Century England. Writing already had a long history in England, and it would have been possible to use texts to establish for example, the age of majority of the heir to an estate. But people were skeptical about texts, noting not only the cost of generating and managing them, but the problems involved in preventing tampering or frauds.

As a result, they retained the traditional solution: gathering together "mature wise seniors of many years, having good testimony", and publicly discussing the age of the heir with them, until agreement was reached. This hallmark principle of orality, that truth emerges best from communal process, resonates today in the jury system.

Homeostatic
Oral societies conserve their limited capacity to store information, and retain the relevance of their information to the interest of their present members, by shedding memories that have lost their past significance.

Written records prepared by the British in Ghana in the early 1900s show that Ndewura Jakpa, the seventeenth century founder of the state of the Gonja people, had seven sons, each of whom ruled a territorial division within the state. Six decades later two of the divisions had disappeared for various reasons. The myths of the Gonja had been revised to recount that Jakpa had five sons, and that five divisions were created. Since they had no practical, present purpose, the other two sons and divisions had evaporated.

Situational rather than abstract
In oral cultures, concepts are used in a way that minimizes abstraction, focusing to the greatest extent possible on objects and situations directly known by the speaker. A study by Alexander Luria, a psychologist who did extensive fieldwork comparing oral and literate subjects in remote areas of Uzbekistan and Kirghizia in 1931–2 documented the highly situational nature of oral thinking.

 Oral subjects always used real objects they were familiar with to refer to geometric shapes; for example a plate or the moon might be used to refer to a circle.
 Asked to select three similar words from the following list "hammer, saw, log, hatchet", oral subjects would reject the literate solution (removing the log to produce a list of 3 tools), pointing out that without the log there wasn't much use for the tools.
 Oral subjects took a practical, not an abstract, approach to syllogisms. Luria asked them this question. In the far north, where there is snow, all bears are white. Novaya Zemlya is in the far north and there is always snow there. What colour are the bears? Typical response: "I don't know. I've seen a black bear. I've never seen any others. … Every locality has its own animals."
 Oral subjects proved unwilling to analyze themselves. When asked "what sort of person are you?" one responded: "What can I say about my own heart? How can I talk about my character? Ask others; they can tell you about me. I myself can’t say anything."

See also

 Art of memory
 Oral tradition
 Ethnopoetics
 History of communication
 History of writing
 Intangible culture
 Linguistic anthropology
 Oracy
 Oral contract
 Oral history
 Oral interpretation
 Oral law
 Oral poetry
 Performance poetry
 Public speaking
 Storytelling
 World Oral Literature Project

References

Sources

Further reading

.

Oral tradition
Cultural anthropology
Linguistics
Rural community development
Educational psychology